The 1991–92 New Mexico State Aggies men's basketball team represented New Mexico State University in the 1991–92 college basketball season. This was Neil McCarthy's 7th season as head coach. The Aggies played their home games at Pan American Center and competed in the Big West Conference. They finished the season 25–8, 12–6 in Big West play to earn a third-place finish in the conference regular season standings. They won the Big West tournament to earn an automatic bid to the NCAA tournament as No. 12 seed in the West region.

In the opening round, New Mexico State upset No. 5 seed DePaul, 81–73. The Aggies followed that success by defeating No. 13 seed Southwestern Louisiana to reach the Sweet Sixteen. Despite a valiant effort, New Mexico State lost to No. 1 seed UCLA in the West Regional semifinal, 85–78.

Roster

Schedule and results

|-
!colspan=9 style=| Regular season

|-
!colspan=9 style=|Big West tournament

|-
!colspan=9 style=|NCAA tournament

References

New Mexico State
New Mexico State
New Mexico State Aggies men's basketball seasons
Aggies
Aggies